Ballycamus or Ballycamusk is a townland in County Tipperary, Ireland. The River Suir forms its eastern boundary.

Angling
The waters of the River Suir in the area, are run by Thurles, Holycross and Ballycamus anglers, and river trout can be caught here.

References

Townlands of County Tipperary